The International Tour de Toona was a stage bicycle race held in Central Pennsylvania in July from 1987 until 2011. The event became the largest pro-am cycling event in North America and had stages spanning Blair, Cambria, Bedford, and Somerset Counties in Pennsylvania. The name was changed to The International for the 2002 edition of the race and then to the International Tour de Toona for the 2004 edition.

In 2008, tour organizers scaled back the event to a one-day criterium race in downtown Altoona.  On May 22, 2009, it was announced that the 2009 Tour de Toona would be canceled due to a lack of sponsorship. The 2010 event was again a single day criterium race in downtown Altoona In 2011 the event returned to being a 4-day 4 stage race for both men and women. In 2012, the event was cancelled due to financial mismanagement and the USAC announced the event would not be held again.

Results

Overall winners

External links
Coverage of 2005 event on Cycling News

Cycle races in the United States
Women's road bicycle races
Recurring sporting events established in 1987
1987 establishments in Pennsylvania
Men's road bicycle races
Cycling in Pennsylvania
2011 disestablishments in Pennsylvania
Defunct cycling races in the United States